Ondřej Švaňhal (born February 12, 1989) is a Czech professional ice hockey player who currently plays with HC Kometa Brno in the Czech Extraliga.

References

External links

Czech ice hockey forwards
HC Kometa Brno players
Living people
1986 births
Ice hockey people from Brno
Hokej Šumperk 2003 players
HC Olomouc players
EHC Freiburg players
BK Havlíčkův Brod players
Rytíři Kladno players
Czech expatriate ice hockey players in Germany